The Mayer Crags form a rugged V-shaped massif in Antarctica. It was named by the Advisory Committee on Antarctic Names for Lieutenant Robert V. Mayer, U.S. Navy, a pilot of Hercules aircraft in four Antarctic seasons, and plane commander for a mid-winter evacuation flight on June 26, 1964.

References

Cliffs of the Ross Dependency
Dufek Coast